Vladimir Putin has led Russian politics since 1999, either as Prime Minister or as president. During his political career, he has made a number of significant speeches.

List 
2000:
 First inauguration of Vladimir Putin
2004:
 Second inauguration of Vladimir Putin
2007:
 Munich speech of Vladimir Putin
2012:
 Third inauguration of Vladimir Putin
2014:
 Crimean speech of Vladimir Putin
 Valdai speech of Vladimir Putin
2018:
 Fourth inauguration of Vladimir Putin
2020:
 2020 Presidential Address to the Federal Assembly
2022:
 Address concerning the events in Ukraine
 On conducting a special military operation
 2022 Moscow rally

See also 
 Putinism
 Public image of Vladimir Putin